This is an incomplete list of artworks by the British Norwich School artist John Middleton (9 January 1827 – 11 November 1856).

Watercolours

A Barn, Tunbridge Wells, Kent (1847) - private collection
A Fine Day in February (Hellesdon, Norfolk) (exhibited at the Royal Academy and at the British Institution in 1852) – Norfolk Museums Collections 
A Limestone Quarry, Combe Martin, Devon – provenance not yet known 
An Avenue of Trees in Gunton Park – Fitzwilliam Museum
A Path through a Wooded Landscape – Fitzwilliam Museum
A Stream in Arran (exhibited at the Royal Academy in 1854)
A Stream near Clovelly, North Devon
A Study in March on the Norfolk Coast (exhibited at the Royal Academy in 1852)
A Farm Building
A Tributary of the Lynn (exhibited at the British Institution in 1853)
An Old Cottage at Tunbridge Wells, Kent (?)
 Autumn (exhibited at the Royal Academy in 1847) – location unknown
Avenue of Limes at Hatfield (exhibited at the Royal Academy in 1849) 
Blofield 
Bulls in a Landscape (?) – Norfolk Museums Collections
Cantley Beck near Ketteringham (1848) – Norfolk Museums Collections
Clearing the Wood — Early Spring (exhibited at the Royal Academy in 1850) https://archive.org/stream/norwichschoolofp00dick/norwichschoolofp00dick_djvu.txt
Clearing with a lumber mill (1847?) Metropolitan Museum of Art
Clovelly, on the Coast of Devonshire (exhibited at the Royal Academy in 1851) https://archive.org/stream/norwichschoolofp00dick/norwichschoolofp00dick_djvu.txt
Feeding the Fowl-possibly the Old Saw Mills, Gunton Park (?) 
Felled Timber — Early Spring (exhibited at the Royal Academy in 1853)
Gensheraig. Isle of Arran (exhibited at the British Institution in 1854)
Gunton Park, Norfolk (1847) – Norfolk Museums Collections
In the Isle of Arran, looking over the Firth of Clyde (exhibited at the Royal Academy in 1854)
Landscape (1847) – Norfolk Museums Collections
Landscape with Pollards (?) – Norfolk Museums Collections
Landscape with trees and farm buildings (undated) –Victoria and Albert Museum
Looking down the Stream (exhibited at the Royal Academy in 1855) 
On the River at Thorpe (?) 
Road Scene (?) – Norfolk Museums Collections
Sand Hills on the Norfolk Coast (exhibited at the British Institution in 1853)
Scene in North Wales (exhibited at the British Institution in 1847)
Scene near Tunbridge Wells, Kent (exhibited at the British Institution in 1848)
Stepping Stones (?) – Norfolk Museums Collections
Study of trees and rocks – Norfolk Museums Collections
Summer — A Study from Nature (exhibited at the British Institution in 1852)
Sunshine and Shade, Ivybridge, Devon (exhibited at the British Institution in 1855)
The Beech Forest - Evening (exhibited at the Royal Academy in 1848)
The Field-burn (exhibited at the Royal Academy in 1847)
The Greenwood Glade (1850)
The Avenue, Gunton Park, Norfolk (1848) – Norfolk Museums Collections 
The Greenwood Glade (exhibited at the British Institution in 1850)
The Roadside Barn (exhibited at the British Institution in 1849)
The Stream in June (exhibited at the Royal Academy in 1852)
The Village Common (exhibited at the British Institution in 1849)
The Woods in Autumn (exhibited at the British Institution in 1850 and 1854)
Tonbridge Wells – Norfolk Museums Collections
Trees by a stream (?)
Trees on a Riverbank, Eaton, Norwich (1847). Watercolour over pencil, 32 x 47 cm. London, Sotheby's. Lot 112, 15/7/93. 
Tunbridge Wells (1847) – link to painting (auctioned by Dominic Winter Auctions (July 2018))
View of Mousehold, Norfolk (?) – Norfolk Museums Collections
Weybourne on the Norfolk Coast (exhibited at the British Institution in 1852)
Woodland clearing (c. 1845)

Oil paintings
The Woods in Autumn, Gunton Park (1849) – Norfolk Museums Collections

Etchings
Composition – Norfolk Museums Collections
Felled Timber at Barningham – Norfolk Museums Collections
Hatfield – Norfolk Museums Collections
Ivy Bridge, South Devon – Norfolk Museums Collections
Landscape with felled timber, large tree in foreground – Fitzwilliam Museum
Landscape with felled timber, with clouds in the sky and water to the right – Fitzwilliam Museum
Nine Etchings (book) – Norfolk Museums Collections
Road and Trees – Norfolk Museums Collections
View at Gunton – Norfolk Museums Collections
View near Cromer – Norfolk Museums Collections
Weybourne - looking towards the Beeston Hills – Norfolk Museums Collections

Notes

Middleton, John
Lists of works of art by the Norwich School of painters